Matthias Ungemach  (born 21 May 1968 in Dortmund, North Rhine-Westphalia) is a German rower (6'6"; 100 kg), double World Champion and Olympian.

Ungemach, Armin Weyrauch, Armin Eichholz, Bahne Rabe and Jorg Dederding  won the 1991 World Championship in the coxed four in world record time (5:58,96), which is still unbeaten. He won another world title with the German eight in 1990 in Tasmania (Australia). Ungemach rowed in the final of the coxless four in 1992 Barcelona Spain and came fourth in a heartbeat final. Other highlights were the win of at Henley Royal Regatta, Good Will Games Seattle, Head of the Charles Boston and 12 German Championships in all boat classes.

With his pair partner Colin von Ettingshausen he represented Germany on various world titles and in the Atlanta Olympics 1996 in the coxless pair. Matthias Ungemach retired from professional rowing afterwards.

Ungemach lives with his family on the Northern Beaches in Sydney, Australia and is married to Judith Ungemach ( Judith Zeidler) who won Olympic gold  in the women's eight in Seoul (1988) and bronze in Barcelona (1992).

In July 2020, Ungemach was arrested and charged with several offences relating to an alleged hit-and-run incident on 22 February 2020, which killed 66-year-old Tony Plati. Charges were dropped in February 2021 after an expert report found the pedestrian had initiated the collision and Ungemach wouldn't have been aware of the incident.

References

1968 births
Living people
Sportspeople from Dortmund
Technical University of Dortmund alumni
German male rowers
World Rowing Championships medalists for West Germany
World Rowing Championships medalists for Germany
Rowers at the 1992 Summer Olympics
Rowers at the 1996 Summer Olympics
Olympic rowers of Germany